State Arsenal may refer to:

State Arsenal (Lincoln, Nebraska), listed on the National Register of Historic Places in Lancaster County, Nebraska
State Arsenal (Providence, Rhode Island), listed on the National Register of Historic Places in Providence County, Rhode Island